NGC 140 is a spiral galaxy in the constellation of Andromeda. It was discovered by Truman Henry Safford on October 8, 1866.

Historical Information
Safford's discovery in 1866 was published in the appendix of an obscure paper. Sixteen years later, on November 5, 1882, Edouard Stephan discovered the same object, but was unaware of Safford's earlier discovery. Wolfgang Steinicke's version of the catalog lists Safford as the discoverer.

References

External links 
 

Spiral galaxies
Andromeda (constellation)
0140
00311
01916
Astronomical objects discovered in 1785
Discoveries by Truman Safford